Johann Paul Uhle (17 April 1827 – 4 November 1861) was a German physician and pathologist born in Nossen, in the Kingdom of Saxony. He died of tuberculosis in Jena at the age of 34.

In 1852 he received his medical doctorate at the University of Leipzig. He was an assistant at St. George's Hospital at Leipzig, and in 1859 became a professor at Dorpat. In 1860 he relocated to Jena as a professor of special pathology and director of the medical clinic.

With Ernst Leberecht Wagner (1829-1888), Uhle was co-author of an influential textbook of general pathology titled "Handbuch der allgemeinen Pathologie". It was published in seven editions, and was translated into English, French, Polish and Greek. Uhle was also author of "Der Winter in Oberägypten als klimatisches Heilmittel" (On the Winter in Upper Egypt as a Climatic Remedy).

References
  translated biography @ Allgemeine Deutsche Biographie
 JHU Libraries Catalog

1827 births
1861 deaths
People from Meissen (district)
People from the Kingdom of Saxony
German pathologists
Academic staff of the University of Jena